Majoros is a Hungarian surname that may refer to the following notable people:
Árpád Majoros (born 1983), Hungarian football midfielder
Bill Majoros, Canadian rock musician 
István Majoros (born 1974), Hungarian wrestler 
Jozef Majoroš (born 1970), Slovak football coach and former player
Jozef Majoroš (footballer, born 1978), Slovak football coach
Majka (rapper) (born Péter Majoros in 1979), Hungarian rapper, songwriter and television host

See also
Majoro

Hungarian-language surnames